Santo Stefano is an island in the Tyrrhenian Sea off the west coast of Italy, and part of the Pontine Islands.

Overview
Like the rest of the archipelago, the island was created by volcanic activity.

It is dominated by an old prison built by the Bourbons who owned the island, completed in 1797 and in use until 1965. It originally had 99 cells 4 meters by 4 meters, to house 4 inmates, which were later halved to double the number of cells. The tower in the middle is not a watchtower, but a chapel, where inmates watched the celebration of mass. Built for 600 inmates, it had 800 in 1817 (and 400 on Ventotene). People imprisoned included Carmine Crocco, the most important brigand during the Italian unification, and the anarchist Gaetano Bresci, who killed King Umberto I in 1900. He was imprisoned there for a year before being found hanged in his cell. During the Fascist regime, other prisoners were the future President of Italy Sandro Pertini, Umberto Terracini, Giorgio Amendola, Lelio Basso, Mauro Scoccimarro, Giuseppe Romita, Altiero Spinelli and Ernesto Rossi.

In October 1860, part of the Bourbon troops left the island for the siege of Gaeta.
During a revolt, some Camorra prisoners proclaimed the Republic of Santo Stefano.
The prisoners legislated a statute and remained autonomous until January 1861, when a Navy contingent recovered the island.

The island has been uninhabited since the closure of the prison, except for tourists that visit by boat during the day.

The island has had several names, such as Partenope, Palmosa, Dommo Stephane and Borca since Roman times.

The island which is partly privately owned, was put up for sale in 2012 for the price of €20,000,000. This did not include the prison, which belongs to the Italian state. 

On 26 July 2021 the European Observer reported that  a €70m refurbishment project was to be announced to turn the island into a high-level European think-tank, academy and open-air museum as part of a European integration project

Wildlife
This island once harbored an endemic lizard, the Santo Stefano Lizard (Podarcis sicula sanctistephani). It became extinct in 1965, probably due to feral cats and a snake species.

See also
 List of islands of Italy

References

External links
 

Islands of Lazio
Province of Latina